Macul is a metro station on the Line 4 of the Santiago Metro, in Santiago, Chile. The station occupies the central viaduct of three adjacent overpasses. The other elevated bridges carry three one-way lanes each of Vespucio Sur. It is located on the site of a former roundabout, where Américo Vespucio Avenue, La Florida Avenue, Macul Avenue and Departamental Avenue used meet. The latter ones currently pass under the aforementioned viaducts, as does a canal called Zanjón de la Aguada. The station was opened on 2 March 2006 as part of the connection between Grecia and  Vicente Valdés.

On October 18, 2019, in the framework of the protests in Chile, the station suffered a fire that affected mezzanine, the ticket office and a train that was parked on the platforms, which would prevent its normal operation for several months. The station remained closed until August 12, 2020 when the station was reopened.

References

Santiago Metro stations
Railway stations opened in 2006
Railway stations in highway medians
2006 establishments in Chile
Santiago Metro Line 4